Blakistons is a road transport and warehousing company founded in Geelong, Victoria, Australia in 1889.

History
The company supported many worthy causes in Geelong in the 1980s, providing funds towards a theatre at the Geelong Performing Arts Centre, and a new ward at the Grace McKellar aged care home.

In September 1985 the announced that it lost $373,000 in the year to June 25, despite a 35 per cent increase in sales. In March 1987 the company acquired fellow Victorian transport company Robert Boyd Transport (Aust) Pty Ltd
Transport, trading as  Blakiston Boyd. and posting a $73,000 pre-tax profit in September of the same year. 

A 20 percent share of the company was purchased by Jamison Equity Ltd in May 1994, and in October the board recommended that shareholders accept the $5m takeover bid of Scott Corporation Ltd. The company remains in business today as a subsidiary of K&S Corporation.

References

Further reading
 

Transport companies established in 1889
Geelong
Transport companies of Australia
Australian companies established in 1889